The 2005 World's Strongest Man was the 28th edition of World's Strongest Man and was won by Mariusz Pudzianowski from Poland. It was his third title. Jesse Marunde from the United States finished second, and Dominic Filiou from Canada third. The contest suffered a lot under the lack of topguys - other than Pudzianowski. Number 1 and 2 from 2004 Virastuyk and Savickas had moved to the competing IFSAs World strongest man and left Pudzianowski with an easy win. The contest was held at Chengdu, China.

Qualifying heats

Heat 1

Heat 2

Heat 3

Heat 4

Heat 5

Final results

References

External links
 Official site

2005 in sports
World's Strongest Man